Tanya Singh is a former Bollywood actress known for her work in Aaja Meri Jaan (1993) and Dhadkan (2000). She is married to actor and T-Series owner Krishan Kumar.

Singh was born in Mumbai and is the daughter of music composer and singer Ajit Singh and numerologist Gittanjali Singh. Her sister is actress Nattasha Singh.

Filmography

References

External links
 

Year of birth missing (living people)
Living people
Indian film actresses
Actresses in Hindi cinema
20th-century Indian actresses
21st-century Indian actresses
Place of birth missing (living people)